The class Hydrogenophilalia in the Bacteria was circumscribed in 2017 when it was demonstrated that the order Hydrogenophilales was distinct from the Betaproteobacteria on the basis of physiology, biochemistry, fatty acid profiles, and phylogenetic analyses on the basis of the 16S rRNA gene and 53 ribosomal protein sequences concatenated using the rMLST platform for multilocus sequence typing.

The class comprises one order, the Hydrogenophilales (type order), which contains thermophilic organisms - both autotrophs and heterotrophs, the former of which utilise molecular hydrogen as their electron donor, coupling its oxidation to the reduction of NAD+ with the enzyme hydrogenase. The very high proportion of ω-cyclohexyl fatty acids (specifically C19:0 cyclo and C17:0 cyclo) versus straight counterparts was a major distinguishing feature versus the Betaproteobacteria, and is probably involved in ensuring membrane stability at high growth temperatures. Members of the class can all use molecular oxygen as a terminal electron acceptor (i.e. are aerobic) as well as nitrate, which can be used by some members during denitrification. The autotrophic members of the class do not use carboxysomes to concentrate carbon dioxide or improve RuBisCO efficiency as a carboxylase versus an oxygenase. The dominant respiratory quinone of the class is ubiquinone-8 and menaquinones or rhodoquinones are not observed, though they are in the neighbouring Betaproteobacteria.

References 

 
Monotypic classes
Monotypic bacteria taxa